Jay T. Will (March 10, 1942 – March 15, 1995) was an American martial artist. He trained under Ed Parker and Al Tracy in American Kenpo and was promoted by the latter to the rank of 8th degree black belt.

Will taught over 10,000 students, and was a tournament competitor and a referee (he was PKA Referee of the Year in 1982 and 1983, and Karate International magazine's "Referee of the Decade"), and a media commentator on martial arts competitions. He appeared in over 20 films and also appeared on television many times including "Kenpo Karate for Self-Defense" on WOSU-TV and Warner QUBE and the syndicated movie matinee show "Black Belt Theater" that he hosted. He also taught martial arts at law enforcement agencies, and the Ohio State University, and Wittenberg University.

Will was an active member of SAG (Screen Actors Guild) and worked as a stuntman in both film and television. A sampling of his 80s television work included; Knight Rider, Battlestar Galactica, Miami Vice, Remington Steele, Riptide, The Fall Guy, The A Team, MacGyver, CBS Sports Spectacular, and America Goes Bananas. A few of his film credits include Meteor, Force Five, City on Fire and Jaguar Lives. He was an active member of SAG (Screen Actors Guild).

He appeared on the cover of many martial magazines and was included in many more.

He completed his undergraduate at San Jose State University where he met his first wife, Kathleen Will. They had two daughters, Shawn Kathleen and Haven. His oldest daughter mothered his only grandchild while still living, Megan. 

He also authored two books: Kenpo Karate for Self-Defense and Advanced Kenpo Karate.

In 1985 he "was convicted on charges of possession of cocaine for sale, after authorities discovered $750,000 worth of the drug in his Columbus, Ohio karate school." He served time in Federal Prison (The Federal Correctional Institution, Terre Haute, IN).

References

External links 
 Biography
 

American male karateka
1942 births
1995 deaths
San Jose State University alumni
Sportspeople from Columbus, Ohio